1997 Dakar Rally also known as the 1997 Paris–Dakar Rally was the 19th running of the Dakar Rally event. The rally started and finished in Dakar, taking in a loop including Niger and the Ténéré desert. Jutta Kleinschmidt became the first woman to win a stage of the Dakar Rally. Japanese driver, Kenjiro Shinozuka, won the car class and Stephane Peterhansel won his fifth motorcycle title.

Stages

Final standings

Motorcycles

Cars

Trucks

References

Dakar Rally
D
1997 in French motorsport
1997 in African sport